Higher Etiquette: A Guide to the World of Cannabis, From Dispensaries to Dinner Parties is a book about cannabis etiquette by Lizzie Post.

Reception
Publishers Weekly said, "Those new to the cannabis scene, or those curious about it, would do well to check out Post's work, directed as it is to a more enjoyable and stress-free experience for all involved."

See also
 List of books about cannabis

References

2019 books
Non-fiction books about cannabis